Billy Joe Camp (born c. 1939) was elected Alabama's 48th secretary of state in November 1990 and served from January 1991 until 1993.

A Democrat, he had previously served as a commissioner on the Alabama Public Service Commission and as a gubernatorial press secretary as well as State Development Officer. In 1986 he ran for governor of the state.

Camp is an alumnus of the University of North Alabama.

References

Secretaries of State of Alabama
Alabama Democrats
University of North Alabama alumni
Living people
Year of birth missing (living people)